A mesopredator is a predator which occupies a mid-ranking trophic level in a food web. There is no standard definition of a mesopredator, but they are usually referred to as being medium-sized, compared to the apex predator and the prey in the food web. Mesopredators typically prey on smaller animals. 

Mesopredators vary in different ecosystems depending on the food web. When new species are introduced into an ecosystem, the role of the mesopredator often changes; the same happens if a species is removed.

The Mesopredator Release Effect

When populations of an apex predator decrease, populations of mesopredators in the area often increase, due to decreased competition and conflict with the apex predator. This is known the mesopredator release effect. These mesopredator outbreaks can lead to declining prey populations, destabilize ecological communities, and even drive local extinctions.  

With fewer apex predators to compete with, mesopredators have lower mortality rates and are able to catch more prey. If the population of apex predators declines to a significant extent, the mesopredators can take over the role of apex predator. However, mesopredators that adopt the role of an apex predator occupy different ecological niches than the former apex predator, and will have different effects on the structure and stability of the ecosystem.  

All mesopredators in the ecosystem benefit from this mesopredator release. Apex predators reduce mesopredator populations and change mesopredator behaviors and habitat choices by preying on and intimidating mesopredators. This occurs in any ecosystem with any type of relationship between predator and prey. However, in the case of the relationship between apex predator and mesopredator, mesopredators can be driven to leave the ecosystem, altering the food web. 

Mesopredator outbreaks are becoming more common in fragmented habitats. This is primarily caused by the loss of apex predator species from these fragmented habitats. Apex predators are typically larger animals which roam and hunt across a large territory. When habitats are fragmented, these species can be driven to leave and find more suitable habitats. In addition to this, apex predators often have more encounters with humans, leaving them more susceptible to harmful or deadly conflicts. These conflicts can cause an apex predator to leave the ecosystem. If the situation is extreme enough, humans can kill off an apex predator population entirely. 

When an apex predator leaves the ecosystem, former mesopredators will be released from the top-down control of the former apex predators. Mesopredator outbreaks are also becoming more prevalent as certain resources consumed by these species (such as pet food, trash, crops, and crop pests), are becoming more common in fragmented areas. These resources often appear when development is occurring within or near the ecosystem, creating ideal conditions for mesopredator outbreaks to occur.

See also
Mesocarnivore

References

Ecology